Mafinga District is one of the eight districts of Muchinga Province in Zambia. The district headquarters is at Thendere. It also contains the town of Muyombe. It was named after the Mafinga Hills.

Mafinga District was created in 2011 by splitting the existing Isoka District.

References

Districts of Muchinga Province